The 2015 Bloomington Edge season was the tenth season for the American indoor football franchise, and their first in the X-League Indoor Football.

Schedule
Key:

Regular season
All start times are local to home team

Standings

 z-Indicates best regular season record
 x-Indicates clinched playoff berth

Roster

References

Bloomington Edge
Bloomington Edge
Bloomington Edge seasons